The 2007 OFC Champions League was the 6th edition of the Oceanian Club Championship, Oceania's premier club football tournament organized by the Oceania Football Confederation (OFC), and the 1st season under the current OFC Champions League name. Under the new format there was to be no qualifying round, and instead six teams from the six best Oceanic nations would play each other home and away in a group stage before the knockout round. The tournament took place from 21 January until 29 April 2007.

Auckland City qualified as the reigning champions of the OFC Club Championship. The other 5 teams gained their qualifications due to their domestic league performances. Following the withdrawal of Vanuatu’s Port Vila Sharks, the OFC awarded a second berth to Waitakere United, the leader after the first phase of the New Zealand Football Championship.

The winner of the tournament was Waitakere Utd of New Zealand, who beat Ba Electric of Fiji in the final, claiming Oceania's US$1 million (NZ$1.41 million) berth in the 2007 FIFA Club World Cup in Japan the following December.

Participants

A total of 6 teams from 5 OFC member associations entered the competition.

Group stage

Group A

Group B

Final

|}

Champion

Top goal-scorers

References

 
 
 

2007
1